"Hip to Hip" is a song by British boy band V. It was released on 9 August 2004 as a double A-side with a cover of "Can You Feel It?" by the Jacksons. The single charted at number five on the UK Singles Chart and number 29 on the Irish Singles Chart.

Track listings
UK CD1
 "Hip to Hip"
 "Can You Feel It?"

UK CD2
 "Hip to Hip"
 "Can You Feel It?"
 "Chills in the Evening" (live audio from showcase featuring Tom and Danny from McFly)
 "Hip to Hip" / "Can You Feel It?" (Tom Elmhirst remix)
 "Hip to Hip" (acoustic version)
 "Chills in the Evening" (live video from showcase)
 Interview (Part 1)

UK DVD single
 "Hip to Hip" (audio)
 "Can You Feel It?" (audio)
 "Boy Band Medley" (audio)
 "Hip to Hip" (video)
 "Can You Feel It?" (Discomania performance)
 Interview (Part 2)

Credits and personnel
Credits are lifted from the UK CD1 liner notes.

Studio
 Mixed at Metropolis (London, England)

Personnel

 Miranda Cooper – writing, composition
 Brian Higgins – writing, composition, programming, production
 Xenomania – writing, composition, production
 Tim Powell – programming, mixing
 Jon Shave – programming
 Tim "Rolf" Larcombe – programming
 Matt Tait – mixing

Charts

Weekly charts

Year-end charts

References

2004 singles
2004 songs
Island Records singles
Song recordings produced by Xenomania
Songs written by Brian Higgins (producer)
Songs written by Miranda Cooper
Universal Records singles